Marcela Skuherská-Davidová (born 14 February 1961) is a former professional tennis player who represented Czechoslovakia.

Biography
Skuherská, who was born in Přerov, played on the professional circuit in the 1980s.

She was a member of the Czechoslovak Fed Cup team in 1983 and 1984, which won the competition both years. All six of her Fed Cup appearances came partnering Iva Budařová in doubles, including the final against West Germany in 1983. In 1984 the pair played in both the quarter-final and semi-final, but stood aside for Hana Mandlíková and Helena Suková in the final.

On the WTA Tour, her best performances in singles included making the final at Nashville in 1983 and reaching the third round of the 1984 Wimbledon Championships. She was more successful in doubles, with her three WTA finals including one title, at Hershey in 1984.

At the 1986 Goodwill Games she and doubles partner Iva Budařová won a silver medal in the women's doubles.

She is married to Czech singer Michal David.

WTA Tour finals

Singles (0-1)

Doubles (1-2)

References

External links
 
 
 

1961 births
Living people
Czechoslovak female tennis players
Czech female tennis players
Sportspeople from Přerov
Goodwill Games medalists in tennis
Competitors at the 1986 Goodwill Games